Adam Bizanski (born January 29, 1983) is a writer, director and animator.

Career
Hailing from a self-taught animation background, he is best known for his award-winning music video collaborations with bands such as the Shins, Wolf Parade, and Zero 7.

On May 9, 2005, Bizanski's animated video for The Shins "Pink Bullets", depicting a love story between two soulful paper-made cows, was amongst the first five videos chosen to demonstrate iTunes music store's new capability to sell videos.

He had won the best animated music video award for three consecutive years at ASIF (ASIFA's Israel branch), for his videos for Yoni Bloch, the Shins, and Zero 7.

In 2006 Bizanski's video for Wolf Parade had won "best animated music video" at the Antville 06 MVA's, and rose to being #1 on ifilm.com's Top 100 videos.
His work had been exhibited in Res Magazine, IdN Magazine, Boards Magazine, Stereogum, Motionographer, Filmmaker magazine, It's Nice That, Twitch, MTV as well as in Centre Pour L'Image Contemporaine Genéve, and numerous venues and festivals.

Some of his videos had been published on "Acquired Taste" (Sub Pop's DVD video collection), as well as on RES Magazine DVD (August 2006 issue).

In 2010 Bizanski launched an independent art project called "Singalong Paul", which featured a papier-mâché puppet (named "Paul") who lip-synced along to musical tracks. Among the videos released were renditions for bands including Foals, Guster, and The Black Keys.

In 2012 Bizanski wrote and directed a short film titled "Paul" (featuring "Singalong Paul"), which went on to win the Silver Hugo award at the Chicago International Film Festival.

In 2015 Bizanski created an audio-documentary for the podcast "Israel Story", which told the story of the Badir brothers - Three blind Israeli-Arab brothers who were at the center of an extensive phone fraud scheme in Israel during the 1990s.

Bizanski created and wrote the 2019 Israeli drama series Magpie, which tells the story of a man released from prison after two decades, who seeks revenge on his older brother and childhood friends, all the while having to cooperate with the police as a jailhouse informant.

Videography

Television 
Magpie - (2019)

Music videos

Yoni Bloch- "It's Nice Outside" (2003)
The Shins- "Pink Bullets" (2005)
Wolf Parade- "Modern World" (2006)
Zero 7 feat. José González- "Left Behind" (2006)
Guster- "Satellite" (2006)
Rona Kenan- "Ness" (2007)
Dntel feat. Arthur & Yu - "The Distance" (2007)
Guster- "Architects and Engineers" (2010)
Foals- "2 trees" (2010)

Commercials

Sony Ericsson ("Choose", 2007)
Huggies Little Swimmers ("Left out", 2008)
The Observer ("Book of Art", 2008)
ING Bank (2008)
Celio (2009)
Orange (2011)

Short films 
Paul - (2012)
Shadow Puppets - (2013)

References

External links 

 
 

1983 births
Living people
Advertising directors
Film commercial directors
Israeli film directors
People from Haifa